USS Ionita (SP-388) was a yacht acquired by the U.S. Navy during World War I.  Ionita was outfitted by the Navy as a patrol craft and reported to the Commander, 9th Naval District, headquartered at Lake Bluff, Illinois.  Ionita patrolled the Detroit River and was struck by the Navy at war’s end.

Built in Detroit, Michigan 

Ionita (SP-388), a 55-foot-long motor yacht, was built by Church Boat Works, Trenton, Michigan, in 1914 for use as a pleasure craft on the Great Lakes.  She was acquired by the Navy from her owner, R. A. Newman of Detroit, Michigan, 16 August 1917; and commissioned as USS Ionita (SP-388) 23 September 1917.

World War I service 
 
Ionita was assigned to the 9th Naval District as a section patrol craft and spent the war on patrol in the Detroit River.

Post-war service 

After the [Armistice of 11 November 1918|[World War I Armistice]], she was transferred to the Naval Training Camp, Detroit, Michigan.

Decommissioning 

Ionita was later decommissioned by the Navy and was sold to William Thewes, Cleveland, Ohio, on 20 November 1919.

References 
 
 Motor Boat Ionita (1914); Later USS Ionita (SP-388), 1917-1919
 NavSource Online: Ionita (SP 388)

World War I auxiliary ships of the United States
Patrol vessels of the United States Navy
Individual yachts
Ships built in Detroit
1914 ships